Jan Kazimierz Zubowski (born 8 November 1957 in Oława) is a Polish politician. He was elected to Sejm on 25 September 2005, getting 5,813 votes in 1 Legnica district as a candidate from the Law and Justice list. In 2006, he was elected mayor of Głogów, and in 2010 re-elected for his second term.

See also
Members of Polish Sejm 2005-2007

External links
Jan Zubowski - parliamentary page - includes declarations of interest, voting record, and transcripts of speeches.

1957 births
Living people
People from Oława
People from Głogów
Members of the Polish Sejm 2005–2007
Law and Justice politicians